The National Swedish Board of Health was a Swedish government agency between 1878 and 1968, with responsibility for the health and medical services and the pharmacy services. All the activities in the field of public health in Sweden (including medical care) are either operated or controlled by public authorities. Public health is under the Ministry of Health and Social Affairs, the chief of which is a member of the cabinet. The National Swedish Board of Health was the principal instrument of the State for governing, superintending and promoting the activities and the work of the institutions pertaining to this field. The board supervised the medical personnel, the hospitals and the pharmacies and had the direct control of the State Pharmaceutical Laboratory, the State institutions for forensic medicine, a unit for mass radiofluorography etc. The National Swedish Board of Health was dissolved in 1968 and became the National Board of Health and Welfare.

History
The National Swedish Board of Health originated from a corporation association of physicians in Stockholm, who first received certain privileges on 16 May 1663 under the name of Collegium medicorum (later Collegium medicum), which was confirmed and extended in particular by the so-called medical schemes of 30 October 1688. By letters patent on 27 January 1813, the collegium changed to a real administrative government agency under the name of the Sundhetskollegium ("Health Collegium") and initially consisted of 1 chairman, 1 vice chairman, 2 medical councillors (head of divisions) and 6 assessors, and the senior physicians and professors, who then held membership in the Collegium medicum for life. According to the instruction issued on 6 December 1815, the Sundhetskollegium received the oversight and the board over all that related to the state of health as well as the medical care and the sick care of both the country's inhabitants in general and in the armed forces on land and sea in peace and wartime. As early as 1821, two assessors' offices were abolished, and in 1841 all the other assessors and the vice-chairman, whereas the medical councillors was increased to four. The Sundhetskollegium received a far broader activity than Collegium medicum. Among other things, the obligation to give a statement in forensic purposes, to have control over the veterinary system, the dental and fältskär system, variolation and more, was allowed. However, only in 1876 did the board of directors of the hospital and mental health services (from the Serafimerordensgillet, "Seraphim Order Guild") be transferred to the Sundhetskollegium. From 1878, the agency name change to the National Swedish Board of Health. The state for the new agency was established on 1 June 1877, and instruction for the same was issued 2 November the same year.

Minor changes were done over time, the most important of which occurred on 31 December 1900. The National Swedish Board of Health now consists of 1 chairman referred to as Director General and 5 medical councillors. The Director General and 4 of the medical councillors should be licensed physicians, the fifth medical councillor should be a licensed veterinarian. The staff of the chancellery consisted of 1 secretary, 1 registrar and 3 notaries, and at the accounting office of 2 accountants and 1 treasurer. In addition, the board was assisted by 1 ombudsman and 1 procurator fiscal, 1 chief inspector for mental health care, 1 hospital inspector and 1 architect, and by the necessary number of assistants and temporary officials. For the execution of bacteriological and forensic investigations, the board had at its disposal a state medical institution, the Statsmedicinska anstalten, with a bacteriological and a chemical chemistry department. The National Swedish Board of Health exercised the highest oversight of the general health care system in Sweden and dealt with matters concerning the state's medical health. The board had insight into everyone who was occupied with the expansion of the medical or pharmaceutical sciences, with the exception of university teachers as such, and acted as the national board of Sweden's hospitals and supervised the mental health of the insane in general. In addition, the board had oversight over the hospitals and the cottage hospitals, swimming facilities and other such health centers, as well as the pharmacy system, the midwifery and the fältskär system, as well as the practitioners of the dentistry and physiotherapy activities. The National Swedish Board of Health also had to provide the courts, public and municipal authorities and officials with the information that they wanted and which lie within the area of the board's activities, as well as investigating the forensic issues that arise. Finally, the board had to watch over the epidemic care operations and to exercise the highest level of insight into the variolation and the institutions established for it.

From 1 July 1963, the National Swedish Board of Health was organized under the Ministry of Health and Social Affairs, which was the country's highest administrative body in the field. Its task was then to exercise the oversight over the work of the medical staff, the healthcare agencies and the pharmacy and to have the highest management of the state mental hospitals and other institutions. It was organized in nine bureaus. At its side, the National Swedish Board of Health had various advisory councils and committees taking independent decisions. In addition to the National Swedish Board of Health, some other central institutions operated in the area of general health care. The National Institute of Public Health (Statens institut för folkhälsan) with the main task of conducting scientific-practical investigations and conducting research activities in the areas of general hygiene, food hygiene and occupational hygiene, and thereby constituting a central investigative body for the food control according to the Food Charter. The institute also had to conduct some teaching. Questions about occupational hygiene were dealt with by the Institute of Occupational Health (Arbetsmedicinska institutet). The Central Board of Hospital Planning and Equipment (Centrala sjukvårdsberedningen) had the task to advise on the planning of hospital buildings and their equipment and to work for standardization and rationalization of the hospitals' utensils and operations and the National Bacteriological Laboratory (Statens bakteriologiska laboratorium) with the task of investigating, researching, producing serum, inoculants etc. in the bacteriological, virological and epidemiological fields of human medicine.

As of 1 January 1968, the highest administrative body for health and medical care is the National Board of Health and Welfare, which was formed through a merger of the National Swedish Board of Health and the old National Board of Health and Welfare.

Chairman of the Sundhetskollegium
1813–1822: David von Schulzenheim
1822–1841: Christian Ehrenfried von Weigel
1841–1849: Erik af Edholm
1849–1860: Carl Johan Ekströmer
1860–1864: Magnus Huss
1864–1873: Nils Johan Berlin (acting)
1873–1877: Nils Johan Berlin

Directors General of the National Swedish Board of Health

1877–1883: Nils Johan Berlin
1883–1898: August Almén
1898–1913: Klas Linroth
1913–1928: Bertil Buhre
1928–1935: Nils Hellström
1935–1952: Axel Höjer
1952–1967: Arthur Engel
1967–1968: Bror Rexed

References

Notes

Print

Medical and health organizations based in Sweden
Defunct government agencies of Sweden
Government agencies established in 1878
Government agencies disestablished in 1968